Meredith O'Connor is the Celebrity Youth Activist for the NGOCSD-NY supporting the United Nations and communities globally; a Radio Hit Recording Artist, and has been deemed an icon in antibullying by The City of Los Angeles, and recognized as such at the United Nations. She has played to packed audiences globally and her hit songs are known by millions around the world. Her music has been featured on Teen Nick and Radio Disney. Her activism for antibullying and mental health is credited with saving and changing the lives of her fans. She has been a leading force in the cause of ending bullying and promoting mental health, as well as being recognized for positively influencing the entertainment industry as a whole and recently speaking alongside Charles Schwab, Doris Kearns Goodwin, and Khan Academy's Salman Khan, being recognized as a leader in her industry.  She has also been recognized for her work by members of the United States Congress and the City of Los Angeles. O'Connor is honored to serve on the advisory board of the NGO for Sustainable Development, NY.
The singer-songwriter, actress and former Model is currently based in Los Angeles, and New York. Her latest release is a star-studded international collaboration, titled "You Are Not Alone (International)".  "With some of the biggest names from K-Pop, to Bollywood, Afropop, and more, celebrities from all over the world unite to raise funds and awareness to mental health through the messaging of the song." The beneficiary of the song is NAMI (National Alliance on Mental Illness).  Celebrities on the song include Minzy, RUGGERO, Reekado Banks, and the late legendary icon from the Supremes, Mary Wilson, along with O'Connor.

Rise to fame
Meredith O'Connor began her career as a model. She then became a teen idol when her first music video for the song "Celebrity" went viral and became a radio hit. She then spoke out on mental health and bullying which garnered her notoriety for its impact on the music industry as a whole.

Appearances in film

O'Connor had recently appeared as one of the celebrity cameos alongside Garrett Clayton, Jon Header and many others in Lionsgate's 'Los Huevos' US version. She also had cameos alongside Drake Bell in 'Bunny Bravo' of Superdope TV.
Recently, Arianna Huffington's Thrive had announced the development of the autobiography feature based on the life of O'Connor telling the true story of how her music has impacted fans, directed by Ilyssa Goodman with Garrett Clayton and Addison Rickie playing O'Connor as a child.

Anti-bullying and Mental Health Advocacy
O'Connor recounts that when she was in middle school, she was a victim of excessive bullying due to having an appearance and personality that didn't fit in with social expectations. In an interview with the Long Islander, she stated that "the thing that causes bullying for a lot of teens is just being different. When teens are insecure with themselves they pick on others for being different ... I stood out." 
Based on her experience, she became an advocate for victims of bullying and an anti-bullying spokesperson, becoming an official advisor, speaker, and writer for numerous Antibullying Organizations around the world. Reach Out.

In Steppin Out magazine, O'Connor said, "I was bullied from a very young age. It got really bad in middle school, and when 'Celebrity' came out in high school, people began to be nicer to me. I saw how silly it was at that point, and saw it all as a game, hence the title of the song. I wrote it very honestly, hoping that fans would see it as proof that it gets better."

In 2013–14, O'Connor embarked on a ten city tour, in conjunction with the release of her video for "The Game". During this nationwide tour, O'Connor and her team performed for thousands of young people in their schools, taking questions, signing autographs, and encouraging the victims of bullying to stay strong. 
Her appearances are extremely popular-- "The kids went wild; the atmosphere was electric! Pop star singer, songwriter Meredith O’Connor appeared on stage in auditoriums filled with screaming kids" "Celebrity singer Meredith O’Connor hoped to put an end to it [bullying], as she shared her songs and personal story of being bullied with the students just a few years younger than herself. The gym was filled with posters including "Gators (heart) you" and "We love Meredith," and students waved additional signs of adoration as she sang."

"If you’re feeling alone, know you aren’t, and bullying is only temporary. But lessons you learn from it last a lifetime. So make sure you don’t believe what others tell you and you’ll be ahead the game". although she regularly receives hundreds of messages from her fans, O'Connor still tries to answer most of them individually, and she remains a source of strength and inspiration to youth who have been bullied. See "The Game" video here: https://www.youtube.com/watch?v=T4Qv90HjS_s
In 2014–2015, she toured internationally, including appearances in the United Kingdom, Greece, New York and California.

She has also performed at various venues in Nashville, including the famous Orchid Lounge, and in New York, including The Sony PlayStation Theater and Madison Square Garden Theater.

Music
 
O'Connor released her debut EP in February 2013. The music video for the lead single "Celebrity" went viral on YouTube The EP has been generally well received, garnering positive reviews from music bloggers including Andrew Greenhalgh and G. W. Hill.
see "Celebrity" here: https://www.youtube.com/watch?v=IPJUjvd4iic
O’Connor's single "Just the Thing" was officially released on iTunes on April 22, 2014.  Meaningful lyrics, a catchy melody, and a powerful message about not fitting in with the "popular crowd" are a consistent theme throughout O'Connor's songs. Co-written by legendary songwriter/producer Heather Holley, who has produced songs for the likes of Christina Aguilera, "Just the Thing" blends a bit of country and rock to create this edgy pop song.
Ms. O'Connor released her debut album "I am" in late 2015 to very positive reviews. Both the music video and the Song "Stronger" from the album "I am" features Disney's Teen Beach Movie's Garrett Clayton. The video has its premiere on NBC's EXTRA TV.

The video for 'Just the Thing' co-stars Luke Bilyk who plays Drew on Nickelodeon's DeGrassi show. It was filmed at Clarkstown High School North in New York, with the participation of actual students, teachers and even the principal, who has a featured cameo role. It can be seen on the Vevo channel, http://www.vevo.com/watch/meredith-oconnor/just-the-thing/QMGR31402260

O'Connor is a Celebrity Advocate for the United Nations Project 50/50. Her next film will be based on her own life, produced and directed by Ilyssa Goodman, who directed "A Cinderella Story".

In describing her music, O'Connor says, "My music is definitely pop, and at first had a country feel. Since I
was a child actress in the musical theater world, it is influenced by that too, with a bit of rock. I want to keep my songs interesting and different, but still catchy.  The song, 'Just the thing' is about accepting who you are, and loving what makes you, you. It is a fun upbeat track, and has a similar message to it like the game does, but the game is more of a ballad or anthem. 'Just the thing' is lighter and fun. It can be to a boyfriend or girlfriend, or to a best friend that really gets you. When I wrote it I was thinking about that, and close relationships with people who love you for your weirdness.  I co wrote the song with Heather Holley, and she was really awesome. Writing the bridge of 'Just the Thing' is probably my favorite verse I have ever written, because it is so different and theatrical. Freddie Mercury from Queen inspired it, and the song really does describe me. I love being a singer. I really feel that I can influence my fans, and those who listen to my music for the better, and music is such a powerful way to do it. Acting will always be a job I love to do, but music is something that I can do to really tell people my story. It is such a rewarding platform to have, just like speaking for my cause."  

When asked about how she plans to sustain longevity in her career, O'Connor replied, "In today’s industry, that’s a hard task because people expect to be shocked, and want to see outrageous things. I have entered this industry and made a promise to not let parents and kids who look up to me down by doing anything that could hurt them. However, I do plan to continue with acting, and have plans for a feature film with Prince Lewis Productions in the near future, as well as a dance track."

"I am" was produced by Grammy winner Kenny Ortiz, and features duets with Australia's Jordan Jansen, and Disney's Garrett Clayton. The video for "Stronger" also features a cameo by Madeline Stuart, an internationally known model with Down's Syndrome.

She has toured the United Kingdom, Greece, New Zealand, and many cities in the US, playing to sold-out crowds.  This year she will add Puerto Rico and India to her schedule.  On September 12, 2017, she headlined with Aaron Carter during New York Fashion Week at the Sony PlayStation Theater.

Ms. O'Connor's latest release is an International collaboration featuring stars from around the world to raise funds and awareness for mental illness treatment, called "You Are Not Alone (International), featured in Billboard, and co-starring K-pop's Minzy, Argentina's RUGGERO, Afro-pop's Reekado Banks, and the late legendary  Mary Wilson, of the Supremes.

Modeling

Before O'Connor was signed for her first single leading to her career as a recording artist, she was signed by Model Management Group based in New York City, and then signed her first contract the next year. After that, she did modeling work for companies including Lord & Taylor.

Discography

References

External links
Official website
Official Instagram

21st-century American actresses
American child actresses
American child singers
American women singers
American musical theatre actresses
Living people
People from Long Island
Singers from New York (state)
Anti-bullying activists
Year of birth missing (living people)